Aziz Dheri is the Buddhist mounds site located in Swabi District, Khyber Pakhtunkhwa, Pakistan.

References

Cultural heritage sites in Khyber Pakhtunkhwa
Pakistani culture
Ancient Central Asia
Archaeological sites in Khyber Pakhtunkhwa
Swabi District